Orazio Pannitteri (born 17 August 1999) is an Italian professional footballer who plays as a winger for  club Crotone.

Club career
Born in Catania, Pannitteri started his career on local club Athena Club Paternò and after inCatania. He don't get made a first debut, and was loaned to Acireale and AC Locri in Serie D.

In 2019, he joined Serie C club Vis Pesaro. Pannitteri made his professional debut on 29 September 2019 against Triestina. He extended his contract in June 2020.

On 31 August 2021, he was transfer to Fermana.

On 4 August 2022, he moved to Crotone on a three-year contract.

Personal life
He is the son of former footballer Ciccio Pannitteri.

References

External links
 
 

1997 births
Living people
Footballers from Catania
Footballers from Sicily
Italian footballers
Association football wingers
Serie C players
Serie D players
Catania S.S.D. players
S.S.D. Acireale Calcio 1946 players
Vis Pesaro dal 1898 players
Fermana F.C. players
F.C. Crotone players